Frances's sparrowhawk (Accipiter francesiae) is a small bird of prey. The nominate subspecies, A. f. francesiae, is endemic to Madagascar, and the other subspecies are found in the Comoro Islands.

The name commemorates Lady Frances Cole (died 1847), wife of the Cape Colony governor Lowry Cole.

Habitat
The Frances's sparrowhawk is found in Madagascar  and the Comoro Islands. They live in dense forests, large gardens, parks and coconut plantations. They live mostly on the edges of forests.

Description
It is grey with a light belly. It has orange eyes and feet, a yellow cere and a black beak. The size of each hawk varies from 28 – 35 cm for a male and 104 – 140 g for a female 112 – 185 g and their wingspan is around 40 – 54 cm. The races from the Comoro Islands are smaller and more rufous than the nominate from Madagascar.

Behaviour

Diet
The hawks feed on a range of prey including mammals, birds, lizards, frogs, and large insects. They knock small mammals, lizards and frog off trees or trunks of trees to shock them and then make the kill. They generally attack flying insects and birds flying straight towards the prey and catching them in mid-flight.

Reproduction
The sparrowhawks build large stick nests in the upper fork of large trees usually 5 - 15m from the ground. The location of the nests change from year to year and they usually breed in October to December the clutch varies from 3 - 4 eggs they measure around 37 x 29 mm but the average survival rate of the eggs is 1.5. Eggs usually have different and unique marking on them. The eggs are usually a greyish-white.

Threats
The Frances's sparrowhawk has no real predators. At one point during the 1900s to 1980s due to the prevalence of a chemical poison the species saw a large population decline . After these chemicals were banned, the hawks' numbers slowly increased and now it is estimated that more than 32,000 breeding pairs that live throughout Madagascar. Traditional hunting still occurs.

References

Frances's sparrowhawk
Birds of the Comoros
Birds of prey of Madagascar
Frances's sparrowhawk